Gary Corbett (July 15, 1958 – July 14, 2021) (from Hendersonville, Tennessee) was an American keyboardist, composer and producer most famous for playing in the glam rock band Cinderella.

Corbett has contributed in various capacities to over 27 albums. In addition to his work with Cinderella he has toured with Kiss, Lou Gramm, has worked with all of Bob Marley's sons. In the 1980s, Corbett co-wrote "She Bop" with Cyndi Lauper.

Big Noise is a side project Corbett had been involved in, playing in Iraq for the U.S. Army in 2009.

References

External links
Gary Corbett's Myspace page

Grammy Award winners
People from Hendersonville, Tennessee
Glam metal musicians
Cinderella (band) members
American rock keyboardists
American pop keyboardists
1958 births
2021 deaths